Basketball Club Oostende, for sponsorship reasons Filou Oostende, is a Belgian professional basketball team. The club is based in Ostend and was founded in 1970. The club competes domestically in the BNXT League and internationally in the Basketball Champions League. Oostende is the most successful basketball club in Belgian history, as the club's honour list includes a record twenty-two Belgian League championships, a record nineteen Belgian Cups and eleven Belgian Supercups.

History
The club was founded on 25 May 1970 and started playing as Sunair Oostende. The team colors were blue and yellow. BCO – a nickname of the club – started in the Belgian Second Division but promoted in its first season after it took the title. But in the First Division the team relegated immediately. But BCO bounced back and promoted once again and got its final spot in the First Division, as they never relegated since.

In the 1974–75 season the club made its first appearance in Europe, when it played 10 games in the Korać Cup. In 1979 the first trophy was won by Oostende: the Belgian Basketball Cup with Ron Adams as head coach. In 1981 the first national title became a fact for BC Oostende, Roger Dutremble was head coach. The club eventually won 6th straight titles in a row in Belgium. In 1988 the club won the first and only BeNeLux Cup.

Before the 1999–2000 season the club got its first name change, as the name of the club became Telindus Oostende, which referred to the new main sponsor. After the club won some more trophies to add to its honour list, the club got a new arena in the Sea'rena – that was named the Sleuyter Arena after one season and had a capacity of 5,000 people – in 2005.

Ten consecutive championships (2011–2021)

Before the start of the 2010–11 season the club name was changed in Telenet (BC) Oostende. In the second Telenet season Jean-Marc Jaumin was fired by the club and the Croatian coach Dario Gjergja took over his tasks. After that the club won the national title, by beating Spirou Charleroi 3–2 in the Finals, Game 5 ended in 75–74 after overtime.

The championship in 2011 was the start of a nice streak for Gjergja, as BCO won the double in 2012–13. Star player of the team was Matt Lojeski, who was named League MVP.

In 2013–14, the club won the double once again, as BCO beat Okapi Aalstar 3–2 in the Finals. Oostende earlier beat Antwerp Giants in the Cup Final. The Serbian point guard Dušan Đorđević shined for Oostende, as he was the Belgian Cup MVP and the league MVP.

On September 23 (2014), the club retired Veselin Petrović's number 10.

In 2017, the club won its sixth-consecutive championship. After the 2016–17 season, main sponsor Telenet left the club in order to sponsor Antwerp Giants instead.

In 2018, the club set a new record by winning its seventh consecutive championship.
 In the 2018–19 season, the team was named Filou Oostende after a sponsorship agreement with beer brand Filou, brewed by Van Honsebrouck Brewery.

In 2019 Ostend became champions again, for the eighth time in a row. They beat Antwerp in the finals.

In 2020 Ostend was declared champions when the 2019–20 season was cancelled due to the COVID-19 pandemic. They were leading the standings at that time. On July 2nd 2020, head coach Dario Gjergja extended his contract for five more year. On July 7th, team captain Đorđević extended his contract for two more years until 2022.

On 9 June 2021, Ostend secured their 10th consecutive domestic title. By beating Mons-Hainaut in the final series (3-1) Ostend brought home the 7th double in 10 years, as they beat Mechelen in the cupfinal earlier in the season.

Since the 2021–22 season, Oostende plays in the BNXT League, in which the national leagues of Belgium and the Netherlands have been merged.

Sponsorship names
For sponsorship reasons, the name of the club has been frequently changed.
Sunair Oostende: (1970–1999)
Orange Oostende: (1999–2000)
Telindus Oostende: (2000–2008)
Base Oostende: (2008–2010)
Telenet Oostende: (2010–2017)
Filou Oostende: (2018–present)

Honours

Domestic competitions
Belgian League
Champions (23): 1980–81, 1981–82, 1982–83, 1983–84, 1984–85, 1985–86, 1987–88, 1994–95, 2000–01, 2001–02, 2005–06, 2006–07, 2011–12, 2012–13, 2013–14, 2014–15, 2015–16, 2016–17, 2017–18, 2018-19, 2019–20, 2020–21, 2021–22
Belgian Cup
Winners (20): 1961–62, 1978–79, 1980–81, 1981–82, 1982–83, 1984–85, 1988–89, 1990–91, 1996–97, 1997–98, 2000–01, 2007–08, 2009–10, 2012–13, 2013–14,  2014–15,  2015–16, 2016–17, 2017–18, 2020–21
Belgian Supercup
Winners (12): 1981, 1982, 1988, 1989, 1998, 2000, 2006, 2014, 2015, 2017, 2018, 2021

Regional competitions
BNXT Supercup
Winners (1): 2021
BeNeLux Cup
Winners (1): 1987–88

European competitions
EuroChallenge
Third place (1): 2010–11

Players

Current roster

Retired numbers

Season by season

Notable players

References

Notes

External links

  
 Eurobasket.com profile
 EuroCup profile
 Basketball Champions League 2019-20 profile

Oostende
Sport in Ostend
Pro Basketball League